Martin Peterka (born 12 January 1995) is a Czech basketball player for SIG Strasbourg of the French LNB Pro A. He is also part of the Czech Republic national team.

Professional career
On 30 June 2020 Peterka parted ways with ERA Basketball Nymburk. Peterka then signed with club Löwen Braunschweig on 6 August 2020.

On December 1, 2022, he signed with Merkezefendi Bld. Denizli Basket of the Turkish Basketball Super League (BSL).

On January 30, 2023, he signed with SIG Strasbourg of the French LNB Pro A.

National team career
Peterka represented the Czech Republic national team at the EuroBasket 2017.

References

1995 births
Living people
2019 FIBA Basketball World Cup players
Basketball Löwen Braunschweig players
Basketball Nymburk players
Basketball players at the 2020 Summer Olympics
BK Pardubice players
Competitors at the 2019 Summer Universiade
Czech men's basketball players
Czech expatriate basketball people in Germany
Merkezefendi Belediyesi Denizli Basket players
Olympic basketball players of the Czech Republic
Power forwards (basketball)
SIG Basket players
Sportspeople from Pardubice
s.Oliver Würzburg players
USK Praha players